Lucas Hufnagel (born 29 January 1994) is a Georgian professional footballer who plays as a midfielder for Bayernliga club SV Donaustauf and the Georgia national team

Club career
Hufnagel made his debut for SpVgg Unterhaching on 6 April 2013, in a 3. Liga match against Karlsruher SC. this was his only appearance during the 2012–13 season. During the 2013–14 season, he scored a goal in 18 appearances. His only goal came against VfL Osnabrück in a 3–0 league win. During the 2014–15 season, Hufnagel player for both the first and reserve teams. He scored three goals in 29 appearances for the first team and a goal in three appearances for the reserve team.

Hufnagel transferred to SC Freiburg for the 2015–16 season. He made his debut in the German Cup on 9 August 2015.

During the 2016–17 winter transfer window in 2017, Hufnagel joined 1. FC Nürnberg on a loan deal until the end of the season. In June, his loan was extended for the 2017–18 season.

In July 2018, Hufnagel returned to his former club Unterhaching signing a three-year contract.

International career
Hufnagel was born and raised in Germany to a mother of Georgian descent. He was called up for and plays for Georgia.

Career statistics

1.Includes German Cup.

References

External links
 
 
 UEFA Profile
 

1994 births
Living people
Association football midfielders
Georgia (country) international footballers
German footballers
Footballers from Georgia (country)
German people of Georgian descent
SpVgg Unterhaching players
SpVgg Unterhaching II players
SC Freiburg players
1. FC Nürnberg players
3. Liga players
2. Bundesliga players
Regionalliga players
Bayernliga players
Footballers from Munich